Sallatira (possibly from Aymara salla rocks, cliffs, tira cradle, "rock cradle") is a mountain in the Vilcanota mountain range in the Andes of Peru, about  high. It lies in the Puno Region, Melgar Province, Nuñoa District. It is situated between the Siriri valley and the Quenamari valley, east of Surapata.

References

Mountains of Peru
Mountains of Puno Region